Silencing is a visual illusion in which a set of objects that change in luminance, hue, size, or shape appears to stop changing when it moves. It was discovered by Jordan Suchow and George Alvarez of Harvard University, and described in a paper published in Current Biology. Silencing won the Neural Correlate Society's "Best visual illusion of the year contest" in 2011.

References

See also

 Change blindness

Optical illusions